Yawning Heights is the first published novel by Soviet philosopher Alexander Zinoviev. Zinoviev expressed skepticism and frustration toward writings that attempted to expose and reveal the evils of Soviet communism. Zinoviev chose, instead, to satirize and ridicule Soviet society in Yawning Heights, presented as the city / nation of Ibansk. The novel has been compared to the writings of Jonathan Swift, Lewis Carroll, and others.

Everyone in Yawning Heights is named Iban Ibanovich Ibanov, so each is instead referred to by a descriptive name, rather than their proper name. Some are recognizable. In the book, one of the characters writes a satirical novel critical of his society. The character knows that the Brothers (KGB) are searching his house to find his controversial book. This represents the level of metafiction.

Satire
As a logician, Zinoviev was able to reduce many features of Soviet communism to what he calls "scientific laws". The book is also filled with numerous paradoxes and logical twists, à la Catch-22. The book begins with a logically reflexive definition: a preface claims that the book details the result of an experiment. The preface identifies the purpose of the experiment: "to uncover those who disapprove of its implementation, and to take the appropriate measures".

One satire in a late chapter is that, after conquering the whole world in the Great Ibanskian Kissoff, the leaders of Ibansk discover another nation, Sub-Ibansk, whose inhabitants live underground beneath Ibansk and subsist on the sewage generated by Ibansk.

Title
The title of the book is a pun on a cliche of Soviet ideological propaganda, describing communism as the "Shining heights".  The words "yawning" and "shining" in Russian are identical, except for the first letter: a Z in the case of "yawning", and an S in the case of "shining".

The "yawning" in the generally accepted translation of the Russian title does not refer to a "yawn" but rather to its meaning as in "yawning abyss".  To capture the paradoxical nature of the Russian title, someone suggested that a better translation would have been "abysmal heights" (the primary meaning of abysmal derives from abyss).

English translation
Yawning Heights was translated into English by Gordon Clough and published in 1979.

References

1976 Russian novels
Soviet novels
Russian speculative fiction novels